Bandwidth commonly refers to:

 Bandwidth (signal processing) or analog bandwidth, frequency bandwidth, or radio bandwidth, a measure of the width of a frequency range
 Bandwidth (computing), the rate of data transfer, bit rate or throughput
 Spectral linewidth, the width of an atomic or molecular spectral line

Bandwidth may also refer to:

Science and technology
 Bandwidth (linear algebra), the width of the non-zero terms around the diagonal of a matrix
 Kernel density estimation, the width of the convolution kernel used in statistics
 Graph bandwidth, in graph theory
 Coherence bandwidth, a frequency range over which a channel can be considered "flat"
 Power bandwidth, a frequency range for which power output of an amplifier exceeds a given fraction of full rated power

Other uses
 Bandwidth (company), an American communications provider
 Bandwidth (radio program), a Canadian radio program
 Bandwidth, a normative expected range of linguistic behavior in language expectancy theory
 Bandwidth, the resources needed to complete a task or project in business jargon; see List of buzzwords

See also
 Bit rate, in telecommunications and computing